Ekaterina Filippovna Lakhova (born on May 26, 1948, Sverdlovsk) is a Russian politician and statesman, former deputy of the State Duma of  VI convocation from United Russia, deputy chairman of  committee of the State Duma for public associations and religious organizations.  Member of the General Council of the party United Russia. She was a people's deputy of the RSFSR, a deputy of the State Duma of the I-V convocations. Chairman of the Union of Women of Russia. Currently a member of the Federation Council, a representative of the legislative (representative) body of state power of the Bryansk Oblast, a member of the Committee of the Federation Council on federal structure, regional policy, local self-government and affairs of the North.

Lakhova is one of the main supporters of the introduction of juvenile justice in Russia. One of the authors of Dima Yakovlev Law.

Controversies
In 2006, Lakhova organized a photo shoot for women deputies in honor of the 100th anniversary of the State Duma. Later, it was revealed that Lakhova sold the photos to a furniture factory, which used them to publish a booklet advertising its sofas. Eleven deputies, including , Nina Ostanina, and Lyubov Sliska sued the factory for violation of personal non-property rights and infliction of moral damage. Lakhova did not join the suit.

Lakhova was also criticized by the Orthodox media for her support of  abortions. Some media occasionally accused her of lobbying laws that would force women to be sterilized.

In November 2018, the media widely criticised Lakhova's comment on the increase of the consumer price index. In her comment, Lakhova said that eating buckwheat all day could be beneficial for health and that proposing an increase of the consumer basket was populism.

Personal life
Lakhova is married, she has a son.

In 2018, Lakhova declared an income of 5,839 million rubles.

See also
All-Russian Sociopolitical Movement of Women of Russia

References

External links
 
 Профиль на сайте Совета Федерации Федерального собрания Российской Федерации

1948 births
Politicians from Yekaterinburg
Recipients of the Order of Honour (Russia)
United Russia politicians
21st-century Russian women politicians
Advisers to the President of Russia
Members of the Federation Council of Russia (after 2000)
Living people
Recipients of the Order "For Merit to the Fatherland", 4th class
First convocation members of the State Duma (Russian Federation)
Second convocation members of the State Duma (Russian Federation)
Third convocation members of the State Duma (Russian Federation)
Fourth convocation members of the State Duma (Russian Federation)
Fifth convocation members of the State Duma (Russian Federation)
Sixth convocation members of the State Duma (Russian Federation)